Košarkarski klub Olimpija was a men's professional basketball club based in Ljubljana, Slovenia.

Olimpija has won 23 National League championships, including eight consecutive titles between 1992 and 1999. They have played in two different National Leagues since 1946, the Yugoslav Federal League (1946–1991) and the Slovenian League (1991–2019). Olimpija has won three regional league championships, one in the Adriatic League and two championships in the Central European League. They have also won 20 National Cup tournaments, 8 National Supercup titles, and one FIBA Saporta Cup. In July 2019, the team merged with Cedevita, forming a new club Cedevita Olimpija.

History 
Olimpija basketball club was founded in 1946 as a section of the Svoboda Physical Culture Society. The first basketball game was played the same year against Udarnik and Olimpija came out on top with the score of 37–14. Late in 1946, the club was renamed Enotnost and was known by that name until 1954 when it assumed the name AŠK Olimpia.

Olimpija won its first Yugoslav League title in the 1957 season under the direction of the coach/player Boris Kristančić. In the following years, Olimpija won five more Yugoslav titles, in 1959, 1961, 1962, 1966, and 1970. A new era for the club began with Slovenia's independence when Olimpija won eight consecutive league titles between 1992 and 1999.

On the international stage, the 1993–94 season was the club's best season as they won the European Cup against the Spanish ACB League club Taugrés under the direction of coach Zmago Sagadin. In the 2001–02 season, Olimpija won the "Small Triple Crown", taking the Slovenian League championship, Slovenian Cup, and the Adriatic League.

On 8 July 2019, Olimpija merged with Croatian team Cedevita, forming Cedevita Olimpija.

The club was a founding member of the Adriatic Basketball Association in 2015. In November 2020, the club's shares were transferred to Mornar Bar.

Names through history 
The club was established in 1946 as the basketball department of the larger sports club Svoboda. Later, the name of the club was changed several times. Since 1976 and until its dissolution in 2019, the name of the club included the sponsorship name.

Arenas 

The team's first venue was Tabor Gymnasium, before they moved to the 4,500 capacity Tivoli Hall in 1965. In 2010, the club moved into their new arena, Arena Stožice, with a capacity of 12,480.

Notable players 

The following players are regarded as the most important for Olimpija by the club's official website.
Ivo Daneu  – has won the Yugoslav national championship six times with Olimpija and earned over 200 appearances for the Yugoslavia national basketball team. In 2007, he became the first Slovenian player included in the FIBA Hall of Fame.
Borut Bassin  – became the most valuable player of the 1967 FIBA European Champions Cup Final Four after scoring 30 points against Real Madrid. Bassin has also won the silver medal with Yugoslavia at the 1967 FIBA World Championship.
Marko Milič  – former Olimpija and Slovenia national team captain, he became the first Slovenian player to play in the National Basketball Association (NBA).
Vinko Jelovac  – earned 240 appearances for the Yugoslavia national team, with which he won the silver medal at the 1976 Summer Olympics.
Peter Vilfan  – spent most of his career playing for Olimpija; he became the first captain of the Slovenia national team after the country gained independence in 1991.
Jure Zdovc  – Regarded as one of the best point guards in Europe during the time of his career, Zdovc played for Olimpija in three spells between the 1980s and the early 2000s. Zdovc has won the EuroBasket with Yugoslavia in 1989 and 1991, and became the world champion with the team in 1990.

A total of 16 former Olimpija players have played in the NBA:

Goran Dragić
Rašo Nesterović
Beno Udrih
Šarūnas Jasikevičius
Damjan Rudež
Marko Milič
Primož Brezec
Vladimir Stepania
Boštjan Nachbar
Jiří Welsch
Soumaila Samake
Radisav Ćurčić
Danny Green
Aron Baynes
Dāvis Bertāns
Damir Markota

Retired numbers

Players in the NBA draft

Honours

Domestic competitions
Slovenian League
 Winners (17): 1991–92, 1992–93, 1993–94, 1994–95, 1995–96, 1996–97, 1997–98, 1998–99, 2000–01, 2001–02, 2003–04, 2004–05, 2005–06, 2007–08, 2008–09, 2016–17, 2017–18
 Runners-up (8): 2002–03, 2006–07, 2009–10, 2010–11, 2011–12, 2012–13, 2013–14, 2018–19
Slovenian Cup
 Winners (20): 1992, 1993, 1994, 1995, 1997, 1998, 1999, 2000, 2001, 2002, 2003, 2005, 2006, 2008, 2009, 2010, 2011, 2012, 2013, 2017
 Runners-up (3): 2004, 2007, 2014
Slovenian Supercup
 Winners (8): 2003, 2004, 2005, 2007, 2008, 2009, 2013, 2017
 Runners-up (5): 2010, 2011, 2012, 2014, 2018
Yugoslav League (defunct)
 Winners (6): 1957, 1959, 1961, 1962, 1966, 1969–70
 Runners-up (8): 1953, 1956, 1958, 1960, 1965, 1967, 1967–68, 1968–69
Yugoslav Cup (defunct)
 Runners-up (5): 1960, 1968–69, 1970–71, 1981–82, 1986–87
Yugoslav 1. B League (defunct)
 Winners: 1984–85, 1986–87
Slovenian Republic League (defunct)
 Winners: 1946, 1947

European competitions
EuroLeague
 Semifinalists: 1961–62
 Third place: 1966–67, 1996–97
 Final Four: 1967, 1997
FIBA Saporta Cup (defunct)
 Winners: 1993–94
 Semifinalists: 1968–69, 1982–83, 1991–92

Regional competitions
Adriatic League
 Winners: 2001–02
 Runners-up: 2010–11
Central European League (defunct)
 Winners: 1993, 1994

Other competitions
FIBA International Christmas Tournament
 Fourth place: 1998

Notable performances in European and worldwide competitions

The road to the FIBA European Cup victory
1993–94 FIBA European Cup

Season-by-season records 
Key

2R = Second round
QF = Quarter-final
W = Winners
GS = Group stage
R32 = Round of 32

R16 = Round of 16
T16 = Top 16
RS = Regular season
L32 = Last 32

Head coaches 

  Boris Kristančič (195?–1967)
  Lazar Lečić (1973–1975)
  Krešimir Ćosić (1976–1978)
  Lazar Lečić (1978–1982)
   Zmago Sagadin (1985–1994)
  Sergej Ravnikar  (1995)
  Peter Vilfan (1995)
  Janez Drvarič (1995–1996)
  Žarko Đurišić (1996)
  Zmago Sagadin (1996–2002)
  Tomo Mahorič (2002–2003)
  Sašo Filipovski (2003–2005)
  Josip Grdović (2005)
  Denis Bajramović (2005)
  Zmago Sagadin (2005–2006)
  Tomo Mahorič (2006)
  Gašper Okorn (2006–2007)
  Memi Bečirović (2007–2008)
  Aleksandar Džikić (2008)
  Jure Zdovc (2008–2011)
  Miro Alilović (2011)
  Sašo Filipovski (2011–2013)
  Miro Alilović (2013)
  Aleš Pipan (2013–2015)
  Memi Bečirović (2015)
  Gašper Potočnik (2015–2016)
  Gašper Okorn (2016–2018)
  Zoran Martič (2018)
  Saša Nikitović (2018–2019)
  Jure Zdovc (2019)

References

External links 

Euroleague.net Official team profile

 
Basketball teams established in 1946
Basketball teams disestablished in 2019
Basketball teams in Slovenia
Sports clubs in Ljubljana
Basketball teams in Yugoslavia
1946 establishments in Slovenia
2019 disestablishments in Slovenia